Dimitris Diamantis (born 11 September 1979) is a Greek former professional footballer who played as a midfielder.

Career
Born in Filiates, Diamantis began playing professional football with Chaidari F.C. in the Gamma Ethniki in 2004, after helping the club promote from the regionalized state championship. He scored 16 league goals for Chaidari, drawing attention from Kallithea F.C. who signed him to play in the next Alpha Ethniki season.

After a brief stint in Cyprus with AEL Limassol, Diamantis returned to Greece to sign with Ethnikos Asteras F.C. in July 2008.

References

External links
Profile at EPAE.org
Profile at Onsports.gr
Profile at Guardian Football

1979 births
Living people
Greek footballers
Greek expatriate footballers
Kallithea F.C. players
Levadiakos F.C. players
Ethnikos Asteras F.C. players
Apollon Smyrnis F.C. players
AEL Limassol players
Super League Greece players
Cypriot First Division players
Association football midfielders
People from Filiates
Footballers from Epirus (region)